The Lachi language (Vietnamese: La Chí;; autonym in Vietnam: , where  means "person") is a Kra language spoken in Yunnan, China and in northern Vietnam. There were 9,500 Lachi speakers in Vietnam in 1990. Edmondson (2008) reports another 2,500 in Maguan County, Yunnan, China for 1995, but Li Yunbing (2000) reports 60 speakers in Maguan out of an ethnic population of 1,600.

Subdivisions
Weera Ostapirat proposed three major subdivisions for the Lachi language.

Northern (Chinese or Flowery Lachi)
Central (White Lachi)
Southern (Long Haired and Black Lachi)

Jerold A. Edmondson notes that Vietnamese researchers recently have not been able to locate White (Central) Lachi speakers. It is also the least studied variety of Lachi.

The Maguan County Gazetteer 马关县志 (1996) lists the following Lachi ethnic subdivisions.
Flowery Lachi 花拉基
White Lachi 白拉基
Black Lachi 黑拉基
Chinese Lachi 汉拉基
Manyou Lachi 曼忧拉基
Manpeng Lachi 曼棚拉基

The Maguan County Gazetteer 马关县志 (1996) also lists the following autonyms for the Lachi.
She 舍
Laguo 拉果
Heitu 黑土
Gudai 古逮
Yibi 依比
Yimei 依梅
Yiduo 依多
Yibeng 依崩

The Republic of China-era Maguan County Gazetteer 马关县志 gives the names Labo 剌僰 (with a dog radical 犭for La 剌) and Laji 拉鸡 (Li 2000: 5).

Geographic distribution
Kosaka (2000) reports 6,000–8,000 Lachi speakers in Vietnam, and 2,000 in China. The Lachi of Maguan County, China are currently classified as Zhuang (Li 2000), while the Lachi of Malipo County, China, along with the Qabiao, are classified as Yi. The Lachi of Vietnam have official status as a separate ethnic group.

China
The Lachi of China live in various locations in Maguan County (马关县), Yunnan, which is located in Wenshan Zhuang and Miao Autonomous Prefecture (文山壮族苗族自治州) near the border with Hà Giang Province, Vietnam. According to American linguist Jerold A. Edmondson, the Lachi of China are thought to have moved to their present location during the Qing Dynasty from places in Vietnam called Maibu 麥布, Maidu 麥督, and Maiha 麥哈. Other Lachis are also found scattered in Yanshan, Qiubei, Xichou, and Malipo counties.

The subdivisions, with their respective locations, are as follows:

Flowery Lachi
Jinchang Township 金厂镇
Zhongzhai 中寨
Sanjiajie 三家街

Chinese Lachi
Jiahanqing Township 夹寒箐乡
Niulongshan 牛龙山
Dujiaozhai 独脚寨
Shi'er Daohe 十二道河
Laozhai 老寨
Renhe Township 仁和镇
Baishiyan 白石岩
Shiqiao 石桥
Huomuqing 火木箐

Pocket Lachi
Nanlao Township 南捞乡: Busu 布苏

Red Lachi
Xiaobazi Township 小坝子镇
Tianpeng 田棚
Laqie 拉劫 / Laqi 拉气

Vietnam
The Lachi live mostly in Xín Mần District and Hoàng Su Phì District, Hà Giang Province, Vietnam. There are also many Lachi living in Bắc Quang District in southern Hà Giang Province, which is outside their home district of Hoàng Su Phì. Since the Lachi dialects of Vietnam have many Chinese loanwords, the Lachi of Vietnam must have migrated from areas to the north in China (Kosaka 2000). Similarly, the Lachi of Maguan County, Yunnan, China just across the border believed that their ancestors had migrated from Ami Prefecture 阿迷州, which is now Kaiyuan, Yunnan.

The Lachi people are an officially recognized ethnic group in Vietnam, and are divided as such (Kosaka 2000, Edmondson 2008):

Long Haired Lachi
Bản Phùng, Hoàng Su Phì District — largest village; regarded as cradle site

Black Lachi
Bản Díu, Xín Mần — speakers have shifted to the Nùng language

White Lachi (language possibly extinct)
Bản Pắng, Hoàng Su Phì District — speakers have shifted to the Nùng language, the regional lingua franca
Bản Máy, Hoàng Su Phì District — speakers have shifted to the Nùng language, the regional lingua franca

Lachi is also spoken in (Kosaka 2000):
Tân Lợi hamlet (Thôn Tân Lợi), Bắc Quang District, Hà Giang Province — formed through a secondary migration from Tân Lập village (Xã Tân Lập), which is now called Xã Tân Thành.
Chí Cà, Xín Mần District, Hà Giang Province
Bắc Hà District, Lào Cai Province — descended from Bản Phùng migrants; can no longer speak Lachi (e.g., in Thôn Núng Choáng, Xã Nàm Sán)
Mường Khương District, Lào Cai Province — descended from Bản Phùng migrants; can no longer speak Lachi

Kosaka (2000) describes the following migratory route that took the Lachi of Bản Phùng, Hoàng Su Phì District to other locations, all in Bắc Quang District, Hà Giang Province.
Bản Phùng, Hoàng Su Phì District
Xã Tân Lập (now called Xã Tân Thành)
Xã Yên Bình
Xã Vĩ Thượng
Xã Xuân Giang (later divided into two parts, including Nà Khương, which has the higher concentration of Lachi people)

The Maguan County Gazetteer 马关县志 (1996) lists the following locations in Vietnam with ethnic Lachi.
Manyou 曼忧
Manpeng 曼棚
Manban 曼班
Manmei 曼美
Jiga 鸡嘎
Hualong 花隆
Mengkang 猛康

Grammar
Like other Kra languages such as Gelao and Buyang, Lachi displays clause-final negation (Li 2000).

Phonology

Consonants 

  appears in loanwords of Vietnamese origin.
Both sounds also can be realized as a voiced glottal sound .

Vowels 

References

Diller, Anthony, Jerold A. Edmondson, and Yongxian Luo ed. The Tai–Kadai Languages. Routledge Language Family Series. Psychology Press, 2008.
Hoàng Thanh Lịch. 2012. Người La Chí ở Việt Nam / The La Chi in Vietnam. Hà Nội: Nhà xuất bản thông tấn.
李云兵 / Li Yunbing. 2000. 拉基语硏究 / Laji yu yan jiu (A Study of Lachi). Beijing: 中央民族大学出版社 / Zhong yang min zu da xue chu ban she.

Further reading
Duong, Thu Hang. 2019. Language of La Chi People in Ban Diu, Ha Giang, Vietnam. Presentation at the Conference on Asian Linguistic Anthropology, the CALA 2019, Paññāsāstra University of Cambodia.
Kosaka, Ryuichi [小坂, 隆一]. 2000. A descriptive study of the Lachi language: syntactic description, historical reconstruction and genetic relation. Ph.D. dissertation. Tokyo: Tokyo University of Foreign Studies (TUFS). http://hdl.handle.net/10108/35586
Nguyễn Văn Huy (1975). "Vài nét về người La Chí". In, Ủy ban khoa học xã hội Việt Nam: Viện dân tộc học. Về vấn đề xác định thánh phần các dân tộc thiểu số ở miền bắc Việt Nam, 389–414. Hà Nội: Nhà xuất bản khoa học xã hội.

External links
https://web.archive.org/web/20131203002223/http://cema.gov.vn/modules.php?name=Content&op=details&mid=511

Kra languages
Languages of China
Languages of Vietnam